D. Nazarbayeva may refer to:
Dariga Nazarbayeva
Dinara Nazarbayeva